Ousmane Fernández (born 4 February 1969) is a Guinean former footballer. He played for the Guinea national football team from 1988 to 1998. He was also named in Guinea's squad for the 1998 African Cup of Nations tournament.

References

External links
 

1969 births
Living people
Guinean footballers
Guinea international footballers
1998 African Cup of Nations players
Place of birth missing (living people)
Association football defenders